Cecily Mutitu Mbarire Aka Karinda (born 26 December 1972), is a Kenyan politician. She belongs to the United democratic Alliance and was elected to represent the Runyenjes Constituency in the National Assembly of Kenya from 2007 - 2013. She has however served as two terms nominated MP in the year 2002 - 2007 and 2017 - 2022.

In August 2022, she was elected the 1st Female and 2nd Governor of Embu County and was sworn in on Thursday 25th at the University of Embu ground.

References

Living people
1972 births
Party of National Unity (Kenya) politicians
Members of the National Assembly (Kenya)
21st-century Kenyan women politicians
21st-century Kenyan politicians